Jonathan Britten is an Australian former professional rugby league footballer who played in the 1990s. He played for Illawarra in the NSWRL, ARL and NRL competitions.

Playing career
Britten made his first grade debut for Illawarra in round 7 of the 1992 NSWRL season against Brisbane at Lang Park. Britten went on to become one of Illawarra's longest serving players in the 1990s and was a squad member in their final season before their joint-venture with St. George commenced at the end of 1998. Britten was one of the Illawarra players who was not offered a contract to play for St. George Illawarra starting in 1999.

References

Illawarra Steelers players
Australian rugby league players
Rugby league wingers
Rugby league centres
1971 births
Living people